Scythris bicalamella is a moth of the family Scythrididae. It was described by Bengt Å. Bengtsson in 2014. It is found in Namibia.

References

bicalamella
Moths described in 2014